Iztok Geister (born 20 August 1945) is a Slovene writer, poet, essayist and ornithologist. He is best known for his avant-garde poetry from the mid-1960s and 1970s. He is also one of the founding members of the Slovenian branch of BirdLife International.

Geister was born in Laško in 1945. He studied law at the University of Ljubljana but has worked as a freelance artist and naturalist for over thirty years. In 2001 he received the Rožanc Award for his essays Levitve (Moultings). In 2005 he won the Prešeren Foundation Award for his book Pospala poželenja.

Published work

Prose 
 Levitve (2001)
 Pospala poželenja (2002)
 Mojster zloženih peruti (2003)

Popular science monographs
 Ljubljansko barje (1995)
 Nenavadni izleti : v slovensko naravo (2003)
 Sečoveljske soline (2004)
 Naravni zakladi Brda pri Kranju (2006)

References

External links
 DOPPS (Slovenian Society for the Protection and Study of Birds (Slovene branch of BirdLife International) site

Slovenian ornithologists
Slovenian poets
Slovenian male poets
Living people
1945 births
University of Ljubljana alumni
People from Laško